The Koenigsegg CC was the prototype for the CC8S sports car made by the Swedish automobile manufacturer Koenigsegg.

Overview

Work on the car started in 1994. Koenigsegg wanted to build a sports car that could exceed the standards set by the McLaren F1 at the time, and achieve speeds over the 386 km/h (240 mph) set by the F1 in 1997. The design of the CC was inspired by the McLaren F1 along with the Ferrari F40. The car, initially painted silver, was then painted black when the new dihedral helix synchro actuation doors were fitted, and finally was painted its current colour. Other two prototypes included the white European spec prototype which was produced in 2000 and the other was a pre-production version of the CC8S. The production version of the CC, the CC8S, was designed in 2002, and was the first car Koenigsegg produced. 

The deal with Audi for the use of their 4.2 V8 did fall flat after the car's designer, Christian von Koenigsegg, made clear his intent of tuning the V8 far beyond its standard output. The next candidate was the Flat-12 race engine developed by Motori Moderni for the Scuderia Coloni Formula One team, in which this engine was raced under the Subaru badge in the 1990 season. These Subaru 1235 engines were purchased and modified for use in the CC. This deal failed to materialise when the founder of Motori Moderni died, sending the company into bankruptcy. Following a deal was made with Ford for use of the Modular V8.

References

External links 
www.koenigsegg.se – Koenigsegg site
Koenigsegg CC specifications

CC
First car made by manufacturer
Concept cars
Sports cars
Rear mid-engine, rear-wheel-drive vehicles